Naviraí is a municipality located in the Brazilian state of Mato Grosso do Sul. Its population was 55,689 (2020) and its area is 3,194 km2.

Founded in 1952 and emancipated in 1963, Naviraí until the 1950s was just a field uninhabited. It was then that began to arrive by plane and by boat and the first settlers in 1955 with the construction of the road linking the Golden Ashland, began to develop more speed. Known as the Capital of Southern Cone, Naviraí has traced urban plan with pathways that convert the center to the periphery, with a format of cobweb.

History
The city of Ashland has an urban design Colonizadora Vera Cruz Mato Grosso Ltda to create, in the middle of then Mato Grosso, a new Canaan. In 1952 is initially populated called Vera Cruz, according to the honônima colonizing, and since 1958 has the current name when it was promoted to Ashland district. From then the city developed and became one of the most important of Mato Grosso do Sul thanks to his early entrepreneurs . Largely came to believe that the region would become a major regional center of a region rich . 
Within decades of foundation were three major economic phases which can be divided as follows as follows: 
 phase of timber extraction and agricultural production (notably the planting of coffee);
 phase of the great cycle of wood and the modernization of agriculture (cotton cycle) and livestock;
 phase of development of agribusiness and Service (1990 onwards).

Development of construction
In 90 years there has been increasing economic development allied construction was crucial to Ashland experiencing an outbreak of buildings and luxury residences located in both the central core when the outer boroughs. Thus, the urban changes contrasted with the social ills and the need for public policies to solve such problems. If not ouvesse Naviraí solutions run the risk of becoming stagnant. But then there was economic policies that prevented the city was lost economically. Among these investments are Copasul (refrigerators), Coopernavi / Usinavi, agribusiness, the garment industry and a strong trade and diversificado.

In current times, with long-term planning, are analyzed the main points about planning for your future and will be decisive for mayor define their actions and develop increasingly Naviraí the coming decades.

Geography

Location 
The city is located 370 km from the capital of the state (Campo Grande) and 1301 km from the state capital (Brasilia) away. The city is adjacent to Jateí, Itaquiraí, Iguatemi, Juti, Alto Paraíso, Icaraíma and Querência do Norte.

The municipality contains 21% of the  Rio Ivinhema State Park, created in 1998.

Rivers 
The city is under the influence of the Rio Paraná, the La Plata river belongs to the river system. Next Rivers:
 Rio Amambai: right tributary of the Paraná River.
 Rio Curupaí: right tributary of the Paraná River.
 Rio Ivinhema: right tributary of the Paraná River.
 Rio Laranjaí: right tributary of the Rio Ivinhema.

Vegetation 
The area is part of the Cerrado (savanna of central Brazil).

Climate 
The city has a subtropical climate (CFA). Rainy season is between October and March. The average temperature of the coldest month is varied from 1400 to 1700 mm between 14 °C and 15 °C. The annual rainfall.

People

Religion
Naviraí is home to the Roman Catholic Diocese of Naviraí. The Bishop is Ettore Dotti (C.S.F.) from June 1, 2011.

Transportation
Naviraí is served by Naviraí Airport located 3.7 km from downtown Naviraí. There is also the bus Alternav. There is also access by federal highway BR-163, great drive, as well as state highways.

Sports
Clube Esportivo Naviraiense is the municipality's football (soccer) club. They competed in the Série D in 2009. The team has had four participations in the Brazil Cup (2010, 2011, 2013 and 2014).

References

Municipalities in Mato Grosso do Sul